The Center for Global Initiatives (CGI) is a research center at the University of North Carolina at Chapel Hill.  It is part of the National Resource Center program of the U.S. Department of Education. CGI offers grants and scholarships to students and faculty to travel abroad, complete internships, and develop internationally focused courses.  CGI also serves as the home to the Fulbright Program at UNC-Chapel Hill.

History
CGI was founded as the "University Center for International Studies" in 1993. The name was changed in 2007 to Center for Global Initiatives.

Programs
CGI is the institutional home to the following programs:

Carolina for Kibera (CFK)
A participatory development NGO operating in the Kibera slum of Nairobi, Kenya.

Carolina Navigators
A K-12 International Outreach program that serves high schools in North Carolina

Duke-UNC Rotary Center for International Studies
A joint program with Duke University, the center offers 2-year fellowships for international students to study at either school.

Scholars Latino Initiative (SLI)
A mentoring program that pairs UNC-Chapel Hill students with Latino high school students with the goal of increasing college access.

Fellowships/Scholarships
CGI offers a variety of funding opportunities to undergraduate and graduate students, faculty, and staff.

FLAS
The Foreign Language and Area Studies (FLAS) fellowships are federally funded academic scholarships designed to provide support and funding to graduate students studying the languages and cultures of specific foreign countries, in particular those in the strategic interest of the United States.

Fulbright Program
This program provides a 9–12-month fully funded international research/study opportunity or an English Teaching Assistantship for recent BA/BS graduates, Master's and doctoral candidates, young professionals, or artists and musicians.

Carolina Global Initiative
These awards are intended to support undergraduate and masters-level, as well as international PhD candidates gain global experience. Especially those with little to no prior experience.

C.V. Starr Scholarship
These scholarships support UNC students who demonstrate financial need to undertake an independent internationally oriented experience.  They were established at UNC in 2004 by a donation from The Starr Foundation.

References

External links
 Center for Global Initiatives

Global Initiatives